A sample injector is a device used in conjunction with injecting samples into high-performance liquid chromatography (HPLC) or similar chromatography apparati.

References

External links
 HPLC injector

Chromatography